Peter Leonard, is a Scottish former footballer who played as a forward for St Mirren and Motherwell in the  Scottish Football League Premier Division and current manager.

Career
Having previously managed fellow Ayrshire clubs, Maybole and Girvan, Leonard took charge of Cumnock Juniors in October 2017. Following a 7-1 defeat, Leonard was fired in December 2018.

On 25 January 2019, Leonard was appointed manager of Whitletts Victoria. Following a poor start to the 2019-20 season, Leonard resigned by mutual agreement on 27 October 2019.

References

External links
League appearances at Post War English & Scottish Football League A - Z Player's Transfer Database

Living people
Scottish footballers
St Mirren F.C. players
Motherwell F.C. players
Irvine Meadow XI F.C. players
Association football forwards
Scottish Football League players
Scottish Junior Football Association players
Scottish football managers
Scottish Junior Football Association managers
Year of birth missing (living people)